The Dangrek genocide also known as "the Preah Vihear pushback" is a border incident which took place along the Dangrek Mountain Range on the Thai-Cambodian border which resulted in the death of many mostly Sino-Khmer refugees who were refused asylum by the Kingdom of Thailand in June 1979.

Context: fleeing the famine after the fall of the Khmer Rouge 

In early 1979, Vietnamese forces overthrew the Democratic Kampuchea regime in neighboring Cambodia. The Vietnamese soldiers swept through the country and reached the armed camp of the Khmer Rouge in the Dangrek Mountains on the Cambodian-Thai border. Tired of war and starved by famine after three years of Marxist rule by the Khmer Rouge, many Cambodian of the Northwest wanted to avoid forced conscription or retaliation by seeking asylum in neighboring Thailand.

Dega people who had been leading the Montagnard resistance against the Hanoi Communist regime also used the opportunity in hope of reaching out to the West, but many were caught by the Khmer Rouge soldiers under Son Sen who forced them to fight back against the Vietnamese as "their common enemy". However, in an attempt to impede them from escaping, mines were planted all around the camps where Dega people were detained, killing and wounding many of them.

Approximately 140 000 Khmer refugees sought asylum in Thailand between spring and early fall of 1979. The number of refugee-seekers in Thailand reached one percent of its total population.

Timeline

March 1979: closing the Thai border 
In March 1979, fearing an overwhelming flow of refugees, Thailand announced that it was closing and mining it borders. In the no man's land along the border between Thailand and Cambodia, refugee camps started to spring. Thai officials developed a policy of "humane deterrence" in order to reduce of number of Khmer refugees in those camps. These were no longer referred to as refugees but as illegal immigrants. The camps were provided only with the bare necessities. Newcomers were refused the right to interview with international representatives in order to be relocated abroad.

June 1979: the Dangrek genocide 
In June 1979 , the Royal Thai Army forced some 43,000 to 45,000 Cambodian refugees who had crossed into Thailand back into Cambodia.

Khmer refugees who were scattered across Aranyaprathet district were forced into buses and driven to the Dangrek mountain range more than 300 kilometers away. From there they were forced to walk down the "Dangrek escarpment, a mountainous and thickly forested ridge". Among the refugees were many vulnerable families with children, as Mengly Jandy Quach, a Khmer refugee who described this ordeal in his autobiography. As him, many of these Khmer refugees were of Chinese ancestry.

After some of the Khmer refugees tried to retreat as they feared both returning under the Khmer Rouge and walking over landmines, the Thai soldiers opened fire on them.

It is estimated that thousands of Khmer refugees died in what has been referred to as the "Dangrek genocide." While those who retreated were shut down by Thai soldiers, most died from dehydration, diarrhoea, and mines which had been placed in the area both by the Khmer Rouge and Vietnamese invading army.

October 1979: from the Geneva Conference to a diplomatic solution 
The news of these tragic events in Dangrek mountains stirred public opinion and caused international outrage.In order to address the tragedy faced by Indochinese refugees, a meeting was held on 23 July 1979 at United Nations Human Rights Council headquarters at Geneva, convened by the World Council of Churches, under the chairmanship of the Deputy High Commissioner, which was attended by representatives of more than 60 nations. Thai Foreign Minister Uppadis Pachariyangkun was accused of using this humanitarian crisis to obtain a political victory by forcing the Vietnamese to retreat, which the latter refused to discuss.

In October 1979 Prime Minister Kriangsak Chamanan visited the border and was so visibly shaken by the misery he witnessed.

By the end of 1979, the United Nations Children's Fund and the World Food Program developed a massive response on the border which in turn attracted more refugees and led to the creation of a number of refugee camps. Thus, Sa Kaeo Refugee Camp was set up "almost overnight" in October 1979 . Rosalynn Carter visited the camp in November 1979. In November 1979, the largest camp, Khao-I-Dang, was opened. More Khmer refugees came fleeing the K5 Plan run by the Vietnamese occupation army which forced conscription on Khmer men in an attempt to build a "bamboo wall" as a Southeast Asian version of the iron curtain to protect Cambodia from Thai invasion.

However, after elections changed the government in Thailand, the open border policy was overturned and the Thai border was closed again by new Prime Minister Prem Tinsulanonda in January 1980, citing fear that the Khmer Rouge would infiltrate Thailand that way. In fact, out of all the refugee camps, five of them, including Site 8, were dominated by the Khmer Rouge. The Thai government created a new word, "evacuees", in order to signify that the refugees would only be welcomed temporarily and that they had to be relocated elsewhere as soon as possible.

Aftermath

Nurturing the Anti-Siamese feeling of the Khmer 
Because tens of thousand of Khmers had been forced by famine to find refuge in Thailand, the violent response by the Thai authorities left a stain and the trauma caused on the modern conscience. More specifically, this inhumane treatment of Khmer refugees has fuelled the Anti-Siamese feeling in Cambodia. Anti-Thai riots of 2003 in Cambodia were filled with the painful memory of the violence inflicted on the refugees in Dangrek mountains. The Dangrek events fuelled not only anti-Siamese feelings but also anti-Vietnamese as the Khmer Rouge used the atrocities in Dongrek as a platform for lobbying against the Vietnamese occupation.

Thai-Cambodian border dispute 

The Dangrek incident was one of the tragic moments in a series of violent events along the Thai-Cambodian border. Without going back to the battle of Siemreap and the fall of Angkor in 1432, it appears that the long-running border dispute between Cambodian and Thailand fuelled the dramatic deportation of thousand of refugees to Dangrek. While the Thai authorities claimed that it was the safest point to drop the Khmer refugees at, it may well have been a symbolic retaliation after the 1964 decision of the International Court of Justice which awarded the control of the Preah Vihear temple to Cambodia. According to the 1904 treaty which ended the Franco-Siamese War, the border in this area of the Dangrek mountain range followed the watershed. After these events, the Dangrek border is know stained with the memory of bloodshed.

Demining along the border 

In the aftermath of war, it has taken decades to take out the landmines left behind by the Khmer Rouge, Thai and Vietnamese soldiers in the Dangrek mountain range, and more generally across Cambodia.

References

Bibliography 
 

History of Cambodia
Khmer Rouge
1970s in Cambodia
Conflicts in 1979
1979 in Cambodia
Military history of Cambodia
Third Indochina War
Genocides in Asia
Cambodian genocide
Cambodia–Thailand border